Arthur George Jenkins (7 February 1887 – 19 May 1963) was a South Australian cricket Test match umpire.

Early life
Jenkins was born at Woodville, South Australia on 7 February 1887. 

He was the son of a butcher, William Jenkins, who died of tuberculosis in 1895, and Jemima "Mina" Patten. William came from Yealmpton, Devon, England, and arrived in Australia on 28 April 1858 on the Storm Cloud. Mina was born at Port Noarlunga, South Australia, on 26 May 1861. Her parents had travelled to Australia from Armagh, Ireland, aboard the Admiral Boxer on 21 August 1855.

Arthur Jenkins had a sister, Eleanor May (b. 1883), and three brothers, Frederick Charles (1889-91), Stanley Robert (b. 1893), and William Roy (b. 1892). When the father died, the three surviving boys were farmed out to people who would take them.  

He married Ethel Nellie Paget on 4 September 1912. They had four children, Ronald Arthur (1913-2003), Eileen Nellie (1914), Lorna Nellie (1916-98), and Joyce Gwenyth (1918-2010).

In his youth, Arthur Jenkins worked as an ironworker, but spent the last 33 years of his working life as a storeman.

Career
As a boy, Jenkins was a mascot, drink waiter, boundary marker, and assistant scorer for Woodville Cricket Club. 

He became an umpire in 1910 and was rewarded with the official fee of two shillings per afternoon. By 1933 he was lecturing junior umpires in the art of the role.

He umpired SACA matches well into his seventies, officiating in almost 800 games. Of those, some thirty were First Class matches, typically South Australia playing against Queensland, New South Wales, Victoria or Western Australia. Others included South Australia v. Marylebone Cricket Club (1928/29 and 1929/30), South Australia v. South Africans (1931), South Australia v. New Zealanders (1937), and Don Bradman's XI v. Vic Richardson's XI (1937).

Jenkins officiated at one Test match, the first between Australia and the West Indies, played at Adelaide from 12 December to 16 December 1930.  The match was won by Australia by 10 wickets.  Jenkins' colleague was George Hele.

See also
 List of Test umpires

References

Further reading
 Bill Frindall, The Wisden Book of Test Cricket 1877-1978, John Wisden & Co Ltd  (1979) 
 Chris Harte, A History of Australian Cricket, Andre Deutsch (1993) 
 Ray Robinson, On Top Down Under: Cassell Australia (1975)

External links
 
 Lists of matches from CricketArchive
 Australia vs West Indies, First Test from CricketArchive

1887 births
1963 deaths
Australian Test cricket umpires
Australian people of English descent
Australian people of Northern Ireland descent
Australian cricket umpires
Sportspeople from Adelaide